Campel is a former commune in the Ille-et-Vilaine department in Brittany in northwestern France. On 1 January 2017, it was merged into the new commune Val d'Anast.

Population
Inhabitants of Campel are called Campellois in French.

See also
Communes of the Ille-et-Vilaine department

References

External links

 Cultural Heritage 

Former communes of Ille-et-Vilaine